Bonnie 'Prince' Billy Sings Greatest Palace Music is a 2004 studio album by Bonnie 'Prince' Billy. It features new recordings of songs from his Palace Music era (1993–1997), recorded in Nashville, Tennessee with a large group of country session musicians. Guest musicians include Eddie Bayers, Stuart Duncan, Mark Fain, Mike Johnson, Hargus "Pig" Robbins, Andrew Bird and Bruce Watkins.

Track listing

Personnel
Credits adapted from liner notes.

 Hargus "Pig" Robbins – piano
 Colin Gagon – accordion, trombone
 Tony Crow – keyboards, synthesizer
 Mark Fain – bass guitar
 Matt Sweeney – electric guitar
 Aram Stith – electric guitar
 Dave Bird – electric guitar
 Ned Oldham – electric guitar
 Bruce Watkins – acoustic guitar
 Mike Johnson – pedal steel guitar
 Stuart Duncan – fiddle, mandolin
 Andrew Bird – strings, glockenspiel, fiddle
 D.V. DeVincentis – saxophone
  Jack Carneal – percussion
 Eddie Bayers – drums

Charts

References

External links
 

2004 albums
Will Oldham albums
Drag City (record label) albums
Domino Recording Company albums